John Hunter (1854 – 2 November 1881) was a Scottish footballer who played for Third Lanark, Glasgow Eastern and Scotland (four caps). He played on the losing side in the Scottish Cup finals of 1876 and 1878, and made several representative appearances for Glasgow. After retiring as a player, Hunter coached Linthouse.

His younger brothers Archie and Andy both played for Aston Villa, Archie being one of the club's most noted early players.

References

Sources

External links

London Hearts profile

1854 births
1881 deaths
Date of birth missing
Scottish footballers
Scotland international footballers
Third Lanark A.C. players
Footballers from South Ayrshire
Association football fullbacks
Association football wingers
Eastern F.C. players
Linthouse F.C.